Rimvydas Petrauskas  (October 21, 1972 in Vilnius) is a Lithuanian historian, and the current Rector of the Vilnius University since 2020. For his outstanding scientific research, he received a variety of awards, including the Knight's Cross of the Order of the Lithuanian Grand Duke Gediminas (in 2018), Knight's Cross of the Order of Merit of the Republic of Poland (in 2019), Lithuanian Science Prize (in 2019).

References

1972 births
Living people
20th-century Lithuanian historians
Vilnius University alumni
Rectors of Vilnius University
Knight's Crosses of the Order of the Lithuanian Grand Duke Gediminas
21st-century Lithuanian historians
Lithuanian male writers
People from Vilnius
20th-century male writers